Sikhism in Pakistan has an extensive heritage and history, although Sikhs form a small community in Pakistan today. Most Sikhs live in the province of Punjab, a part of the larger Punjab region where the religion originated in the Middle Ages, with some also residing in Peshawar in the Khyber-Pakhtunkhwa province. Nankana Sahib, the birthplace of Guru Nanak, the founder of Sikhism, is located in Pakistan's Punjab province. Moreover, the place where Guru Nanak Dev  died, the Gurudwara Kartarpur Sahib is also located in the same province.

In the 18th and 19th centuries, the Sikh community became a major political power in Punjab, with Sikh leader Maharaja Ranjit Singh founding the Sikh Empire which had its capital in Lahore, the second-largest city in Pakistan today. 

According to the 1941 census, the Sikh population comprised roughly 1.67 million persons or 6.2 percent of the total population in the region that would ultimately become Pakistan, notably concentrated in West Punjab, within the contemporary province of Punjab, Pakistan, where the Sikh population stood at roughly 1.53 million persons or 8.8 percent of the total population. At the time of the Partition of India in 1947, it is estimated that the Sikh population increased to over 2 million persons in the region which became Pakistan with significant populations existing in the largest cities in the Punjab such as Lahore, Rawalpindi and Faisalabad (then Lyallpur). After Partition of Punjab, almost 99.9% of the Sikh population left Pakistan for India immediately. Ergo in the absence of partition in 1947 and other Anti-Sikh sentiment that followed, it is estimated the present-day Pakistan Sikh population would be approximately 12,876,000 or 6.2%, well above the current population of 20,800 or 0.01%, as reported in the 2017 Census of Pakistan.

In the decades following Pakistan's formation in 1947, the Sikh community began to re-organize, forming the Pakistan Sikh Gurdwara Prabandhak Committee (PSGPC) to represent the community and protect the holy sites and heritage of the Sikh religion in Pakistan. It is headed by Satwant Singh. The Pakistani government has begun to allow Sikhs from India to make pilgrimages to Sikh places of worship in Pakistan and for Pakistani Sikhs to travel to India.

History

Colonial era 

Prior to independence in 1947, 2 million Sikhs resided in the present day Pakistan and were spread all across Northern Pakistan, specifically the Punjab region and played an important role in its economy as farmers, businessmen, and traders. Significant populations of Sikhs inhabited the largest cities in the Punjab such as Lahore, Rawalpindi and Lyallpur.

Lahore, the capital of Punjab, was then and still is today the location of many important Sikh religious and historical sites, including the Samadhi of Maharaja Ranjit Singh, who is referred to as Sher-e-Punjab .The nearby town of Nankana Sahib has nine Gurudwaras, and is the birthplace of Sikhism's founder, Guru Nanak Sahib. Each of Nankana Sahib's gurdwaras are associated with different events in  Guru Nanak Dev's life. The town remains an important site of pilgrimage for Sikhs worldwide.

Sikh organizations, including the Chief Khalsa Dewan and Shiromani Akali Dal led by Master Tara Singh, condemned the Lahore Resolution and the movement to create Pakistan, viewing it as welcoming possible persecution; the Sikhs largely thus strongly opposed the partition of India.

Partition of India (1947) 

Many of the Sikhs and Hindus of West Punjab and Sindh provinces of Pakistan migrated to India after the independence of Pakistan in 1947. These Sikh and Hindu refugee communities have had a major influence in the culture and economics of the Indian capital city of Delhi. Today, segments of the populations of East Punjab and Haryana states and Delhi in India can trace their ancestry back to towns and villages now in Pakistan, including former Indian Prime Minister Manmohan Singh.

Modern era 

Sikhs have mainly kept a low profile within the monolithic Muslim population of Pakistan. Though, Pakistan maintains the title of Islamic state, the articles twenty, twenty-one and twenty-two in chapter two of its constitution guarantees religious freedom to the non-Muslim residents. Since independence in 1947, relations between Pakistan's minorities and the Muslim majority have remained fairly and politically stable. 

From 1984 to 2002, Pakistan held a system of separate electorates for all its national legislative assemblies, with only a handful of parliamentary seats reserved for minority members. Minorities were legally only permitted to vote for designated minority candidates in general elections. 

The regime of former President General Pervez Musharraf had professed an agenda of equality for minorities and promotion and protection of minority rights, however, the implementation of corrective measures has been slow. Considerable amount of Sikhs are found in neighbourhood called Narayanpura of Karachi's Ranchore Lines.

The historical and holy sites of Sikhs are maintained by a Pakistani governmental body, the Pakistan Sikh Gurdwara Prabandhak Committee, which is responsible for their upkeep and preservation.

The emergence of the Sikh community within Pakistan 

After the independence of Pakistan and the migration of nearly all Sikhs to India the Sikh community's rights were significantly diminished as their population decreased. Today, the largest urban Sikh population in Pakistan is found in Peshawar, in the Khyber-Pakhtunkhwa, where the Pashtun law of "nanawati" (protection) spared the scale of violence which had raged across the Indus River in Punjab. Despite the longstanding tensions between the Sikh and Muslim communities in South Asia, the Pashtuns were tolerant towards the religious minority of Sikhs. There are small pockets of Sikhs in Lahore and Nankana Sahib in Punjab. 

There has been an influx of Sikhs refugees from Afghanistan to Pakistan due to the turbulent civil war and conflicts that have ravaged neighboring Afghanistan, and many of these Sikhs have settled in Peshawar. Afghanistan, like Pakistan, has had small Sikh and Hindu populations. There has been a massive exodus of refugees from Afghanistan into Pakistan during the past 30 years of turmoil up to the reign of the Taliban and the subsequent US invasion of Afghanistan in late 2001. Due to Pakistan's porous borders with Afghanistan, large numbers of Afghanistan's minority communities, based mainly around the cities of Kabul, Kandahar, and Jalalabad have fled, and some Sikhs have joined their kinsmen in Peshawar and Lahore.

The Pakistani Constitution states that Sikhism is a monotheistic religion. Recently the Sikh community within Pakistan has been making every effort possible to progress in Pakistan. For example, Hercharn Singh became the first Sikh to join the Pakistan Army. For the first time in the 58-year history of Pakistan there has a Sikh been selected into Pakistan's army. Prior to Harcharan Singh's selection in the Pakistani army no individual person who was a member of the Hindu or the Sikh community were ever enrolled in the army, however; the Pakistani Christian community has prominently served in the Pakistan Armed Forces and some had even reached the ranks of Major Generals in the army, Air Vice Marshals in the Pakistan Air Force and rear Admiral in the Pakistan Navy. It has received various awards for gallantry and valor. Moreover, members of the tiny Parsi community have some representation in the Armed Forces. Other prominent Sikhs are Inspector Amarjeet Singh of Pakistan Rangers and Lance-naik Behram Singh of Pakistan Coast Guard.

In 2007, the Pakistan Government proposed the Sikh marriage act that allows Sikh marriages in Pakistan be registered. But it was not passed. In 2017, the Punjab legislative assembly passed the Anand Karaj act thereby allowing the Sikh marriage in Punjab province be registered. In the Sindh province, the Sikh marriages are registered under the Sindh Hindu Marriage Act of 2016.

Demographics 

According to the Government of Pakistan's National Database and Registration Authority (NADRA), there were 6,146 Sikhs registered in Pakistan in 2012. A 2010 survey by the Sikh Resource and Study Centre reported 50,000 Sikhs living in Pakistan. Most are settled in Khyber Pakhtunkhwa followed by Sindh and Punjab. Other sources, including the US Department of State, claim the Sikh population in Pakistan to be as high as 20,000. In a news article published in December 2022, there was an estimated 30,000–35,000 Sikhs in Pakistan according to Gurpal Singh and Sikhs will be included as a separate category and enumerated on the upcoming 2023 Census of Pakistan.

1941 census 

According to the 1941 census, the Sikh population in Pakistan comprised roughly 1.67 million persons or 6.2 percent of the total population. With the exception of the Federally Administered Tribal Areas, all administrative divisions in the region that compose contemporary Pakistan collected religious data, with a combined population of 26,970,214, for an overall response rate of 91.9 percent out of the total population of 29,347,813, as detailed in the table below.

Punjab 
According to the 1941 census, the Sikh population in West Punjab (the region that composes contemporary Punjab, Pakistan) was approximately 1,530,112, or 8.82 percent of the total population. At the district level in the West Punjab region, the largest Sikh concentrations existed in Sheikhupura District (Sikhs formed 18.85 percent of the total population and numbered 160,706 persons), Lyallpur District (18.82 percent or 262,737 persons), Lahore District (18.32 percent or 310,646 persons), Montgomery District (13.17 percent or 175,064 persons), and Sialkot District (11.71 percent or 139,409 persons).

Khyber Pakhtunkhwa 
 
 
 

During the colonial era (British India), prior to the partition in 1947, decadal censuses enumerated religion in North-West Frontier Province, and not in the Federally Administered Tribal Areas. Both administrative divisions later amalgamated to become Khyber Pakhtunkhwa.

According to the 1941 census, the Sikh population in North-West Frontier Province (part of the region that composes contemporary Khyber Pakhtunkhwa) was approximately 57,939, or 1.9 percent of the total population. At the district level in North-West Frontier Province, the largest Sikh concentrations existed in Peshawar District (Sikhs formed 2.82 percent of the total population and numbered 24,030 persons), Mardan District (2.34 percent or 11,838 persons), and Bannu District (2.07 percent or 6,112 persons).

At the tehsil level in North-West Frontier Province, as per the 1941 census, the largest Sikh concentrations existed in Peshawar Tehsil (Sikhs formed 3.97 percent of the total population and numbered 15,454 persons), Kohat Tehsil (3.15 percent or 3,613 persons), Nowshera Tehsil (3.04 percent or 6,636 persons), Mardan Tehsil (3.04 percent or 9,091 persons), and Bannu Tehsil (2.82 percent or 5,285 persons).

According to the 1941 census, the Sikh population in urban portions of North-West Frontier Province was approximately 41,399, or 7.5 percent of the total urban population. Cities/urban areas in North-West Frontier Province with the largest Sikh concentrations included Mardan (Sikhs formed 14.15 percent of the total population and numbered 6,014 persons), Bannu (12.71 percent or 4,894 persons), Risalpur (11.37 percent or 1,024 persons), Haripur (11.1 percent or 1,035 persons), and Abbottabad (9.77 percent or 2,680 persons).

Balochistan 
According to the 1941 census, the Sikh population in Baluchistan Agency (the region that composes contemporary Balochistan, Pakistan) was approximately 12,044, or 1.4 percent of the total population. At the district/princely state level in Baluchistan Agency, the largest Sikh concentrations existed in Quetta–Pishin District (Sikhs formed 5.62 percent of the total population and numbered 8,787 persons), Bolan District (3.06 percent or 184 persons), Zhob District (1.75 percent or 1,076 persons), Loralai District (1.34 percent or 1,124 persons), and Chaghai District (0.6 percent or 181 persons). 

According to the 1941 census, the Sikh population in urban portions of Baluchistan Agency was approximately 11,041, or 9.7 percent of the total urban population. Cities/urban areas in Baluchistan Agency with the largest Sikh concentrations included Loralai (Sikhs formed 21.9 percent of the total population and numbered 1,116 persons), Quetta (11.42 percent or 7,364 persons), Fort Sandeman (10.73 percent or 1,004 persons), Chaman (10.48 percent or 697 persons), and Pishin (9.68 percent or 183 persons).

Religious Persecution 
In Pakistan multiple incidents of discrimination against religious minorities have occurred. These attacks are usually blamed on religious extremists but certain laws in the Pakistan Criminal Code and government inaction are also thought to cause these attacks to surge. Sunni militant groups operate with impunity across Pakistan, as law enforcement officials either turn a blind eye or appear helpless to prevent widespread attacks against religious minorities. Sikhs have been victims of massacres, targeted assassinations and forced conversions, mostly in Peshawar.

Pakistani Sikh diaspora 
Many Pakistani Sikhs have emigrated to countries like the United Kingdom (UK), Canada and Thailand. According to the UK's 2001 census, there were 346 Pakistani Sikhs in the UK. There is also a growing Pakistani Sikh expatriate community in the United Arab Emirates.

Notable Pakistani Sikhs 
Following are some of notable Pakistani Sikhs:

Politics 
Ramesh Singh Arora: first Sikh member of Provincial Assembly of the Punjab of Pakistan
Dr. Suran Singh: member of Khyber Pakhtunkhwa Assembly; served as Minister for Minorities
Gurdeep Singh: sikh member of the upper house of Pakistani Parliament after 2021 Pakistani Senate election

Music 
The first Pakistani Sikh musician also emerged on the music industry in 2009, Jassi Lailpuria, launched his first song on independence day entitled, Sohna Pakistan. A Sikh named Taranjeet Singh is an VJ, anchor and host on PTV channel.

Rupinder Singh Magon (Rup Magon), from the band Josh, is also a superstar in Pakistan and is he was also part of Coke Studio.

Sikh Gurdwaras in Pakistan

Gallery

See also
 Pakistan Sikh Council
 Pakistan Sikh Gurdwara Prabandhak Committee
 2010 Sikh beheadings by the Taliban
 History of Sikhism

Notes

References

External links
 Muslim leaders condemn brutal killing of Sikhs by Taliban in Pakistan. TCN News.
 
 
 
 

 
Persecution by Muslims